The Anna Nicole Story (also known as Anna Nicole) is an American biographical drama television film about late actress and Playboy Playmate Anna Nicole Smith. The film stars Agnes Bruckner as Smith and was distributed by Lifetime Movie Network. It premiered on June 29, 2013.

Plot
The movie depicted the tragic life of model Anna Nicole Smith from small town dancer to Playboy centerfold, to her marriage to a billionaire, and her death in 2007.

Cast
 Agnes Bruckner as Anna Nicole Smith
 Alexa Blair as 14-Year Old Anna Nicole Smith
 Julia Walters as 7-Year Old Anna Nicole Smith
 Martin Landau as J. Howard Marshall
 Adam Goldberg as Howard K. Stern 
 Cary Elwes as E. Pierce Marshall
 Virginia Madsen as Virgie Arthur
 Graham Patrick Martin as Daniel Wayne Smith
 Caleb Barwick as Middle Daniel Wayne Smith
 Luke Donaldson as Young Daniel Wayne Smith
 Donny Boaz as Larry Birkhead
 Cristina Franco as Sylvan
 Jay Huguley as John Lawfton
 Billy Slaughter as Producer #1

References

External links
  Atlanta shoot
  Anna Nicole IMDb
   Agnnes Bruckner
  First look
 Filming the movie
  Shot in Atlanta
  Deadline
 Bruckner

2013 television films
2013 films
2013 biographical drama films
Lifetime (TV network) films
American biographical drama films
Biographical films about actors
Biographical films about models
Films about pornography
Films about Playboy
Films set in 1994
Films set in 2007
Cultural depictions of Anna Nicole Smith
2010s English-language films
Films directed by Mary Harron
2010s American films